The 2019–20 Professional U23 Development League was the eighth season of the Professional Development League system.

The competition was suspended due to the COVID-19 pandemic after group stage matches on 12 March 2020, and was originally to restart in June 2020. However, the season was eventually cancelled on 1 May 2020. The league was decided on a points-per-game system in August 2020 with Chelsea winning the Division 1 title and Wolverhampton Wanderers being relegated. In Division 2, West Ham United and Manchester United were promoted with no promotion play-offs being played.

Premier League 2

Division 1

Table

Results

Division 2

Table

Results

See also
 2019–20 in English football

References

2019–20 in English football leagues
2019-20
England